Neolithodes nipponensis is a species of king crab which is found in Japan and Taiwan.

In the Southern Pacific 
In 2001, an article was published in Zoosystema which reported N. nipponensis in Fiji. Likewise, in 2003, an article was published in Scientia Marina which reported it in the Solomon Islands. However, both of these appear to be a yet-undescribed species.

Etymology 
"Neolithodes" is derived from Greek and Latin and means "new stone-crab", while "nipponensis" – "Nippon" with the Latin suffix "-ensis" – means "of or from Japan".

See also 

 Neolithodes flindersi, a species which closely resembles N. nipponensis

References 

King crabs
Crustaceans described in 1971
Crustaceans of the Pacific Ocean
Crustaceans of Japan
Arthropods of Taiwan